Marit Roaldseth (born 27 July 1977) is a retired Norwegian cross-country skier.

She performed well at the Junior World Championships, with a fourth place in 1996 and an eighth place in 1997, both in the 5 km.

She made his World Cup debut in November 1997 in Beitostølen, placing lowly. She broke the top 30-barrier with a 24th place in November 1999 in Kiruna. Capitalizing on the introduction of sprint events, she placed fourth in Engelberg and sixth in Kitzbühel, both in December 1999. She never made the podium. Her last World Cup start came in March 2004 in Lahti.

Competing at two World Championships, in 2001 she finished 18th in the 10 kilometres and 15th in the 15 km, and in 2001 she finished 28th in the 10 km and 31st in the 15 km.

She represented the sports club Molde og Omegn IF. She married fellow skier Håvard Bjerkeli.

Cross-country skiing results
All results are sourced from the International Ski Federation (FIS).

World Championships

a.  Cancelled due to extremely cold weather.

World Cup

Season standings

Team podiums
 1 podium

References

External links

1977 births
Living people
People from Molde
Norwegian female cross-country skiers
Sportspeople from Møre og Romsdal